Ernst Robert Baumeister (born 22 January 1957) is an Austrian football manager and former player.

Club career
Nicknamed Tschick, Baumeister signed his first professional contract in 1974 with Austria Wien, only for him to stay with them for 13 years and winning 8 league titles. In 1978, he played in the UEFA Cup Winners Cup Final which Austria lost 4–0 to R.S.C. Anderlecht.

In 1987, he moved to city rivals Admira Wacker before retiring at LASK Linz and SV Traun.

International career
Baumeister made his debut for Austria in a May 1978 friendly match against the Netherlands and was a participant at the 1978 FIFA World Cup and 1982 FIFA World Cup. He earned 39 caps in total, scoring 1 goal.

Honours
Austrian Football Bundesliga (8):
 1976, 1978, 1979, 1980, 1981, 1984, 1985, 1986
Austrian Cup (4):
 1977, 1980, 1982, 1986

External links 
 Austria Wien archive 
 Austria Wien archive

References

1957 births
Living people
Footballers from Vienna
Austrian footballers
Austria international footballers
1978 FIFA World Cup players
1982 FIFA World Cup players
FK Austria Wien players
FC Admira Wacker Mödling players
LASK players
Austrian Football Bundesliga players
Austrian football managers
FK Austria Wien managers
FC Admira Wacker Mödling managers
Association football midfielders
People from Favoriten